The Azzam Pasha quotation was part of a statement made by Abdul Rahman Hassan Azzam, the Secretary-General of the Arab League from 1945 to 1952, in which he declared in 1947 that, were a war to take place with the proposed establishment of a Jewish state, it would lead to "a war of extermination and momentous massacre which will be spoken of like the Mongolian massacre and the Crusades." The quote was universally cited for decades as having been uttered on the eve of the outbreak of hostilities between Israel and the Arab states several months later. The source of the quote was traced by the computer scientist Brendan McKay to an October 11, 1947, article in the Egyptian newspaper Akhbar al-Yom, titled "A War of Extermination", which included the quote, with the added words "Personally, I hope the Jews do not force us into this war, because it would be a war of extermination and momentous massacre ". 

The historian Efraim Karsh considers this quote a "genocidal threat". The Israeli historian Tom Segev has disputed Karsh's interpretation, saying that "Azzam used to talk a lot" and pointing to another statement from May 21, 1948, in which Azzam Pasha declared his desire for "equal citizenship for Jews in Arab Palestine".

The quotation in historical context 
The United Nations Special Committee on Palestine was set up in May 1947 to develop proposals for the partition of Palestine. Recommendations to this effect were made in September of that year. The majority plan proposed a distinct two-state solution, the minority plan foresaw a federal state. Though the Jews had accepted the majority plan, the Arab countries were unanimous in their negative reactions to both plans, and openly spoke of taking up arms were either of these proposals enacted. For Ernest Bevin, the British Foreign Secretary, the majority plan would only lead to an outbreak of generalised violence, as clearly unjust to the Arabs, whilst the minority plan was inapplicable since it assumed a prior accord between Jews and Arabs.

On September 15, Azzam Pasha, who was held in high esteem by David Ben-Gurion, met a Zionist delegation in London, consisting of Abba Eban, David Horowitz, both liaison officers with the Jewish Agency who were accompanied by the journalist Jon Kimche. The emissaries stated that there was no doubt that a Jewish state would be established and requested that the Arab states accept the consequences and cooperate. They were willing to give cast-iron guarantees against any form of Jewish expansionism. Azzam Pasha, in his capacity as Secretary General of the Arab League, suggested that the Zionist project be abandoned, and that the Jews could integrate themselves into Arab society on the basis of autonomous entities. He argued that it was pointless to appeal to political realism when the whole Zionist project demonstrated the efficacy of will-power. There was no option but war. The Zionists, he argued, would be thrown out in the future, just as the Crusaders had been. His Zionist interlocutors read this statement as a fascist declaration, unable, according to Henry Laurens, to see that, as with the Jews of Europe, emancipation from enslavement for the Arabs was seen as requiring recourse to force.

In Horowitz's account, Azzam declared:

Upon being informed of the meeting, Ben-Gurion, who had previously called Azzam the "most honest and humane among Arab leaders", and who had earlier ordered the Haganah to prepare for a war, summarized Azzam's position in a meeting with members of his political party:

At the pan-Arab summit of 19 September 1947, which convened at Saoufar in Lebanon, the League decided to employ all available means to ensure the independence of Palestine as an Arab state.

On October 11, the editor of Akhbar al-Yom, Mustafa Amin, ran an interview he had obtained from Azzam Pasha to report on the outcome of the summit. The article was entitled, "A War of Extermination,"(Arabic transliteration required), and in one passage contained the following words.

In early December 1947 Azzam told a rally of students in Cairo that "The Arabs conquered the Tartars and the Crusaders and they are now ready to defeat the new enemy," echoing sentiments he had expressed to a journalist the previous day.

Jewish Agency Memorandum 
A Jewish Agency memorandum, submitted on February 2, 1948, to the U.N. Palestine Commission, tasked with the implementation of the partition resolution, and yet again to the U.N. secretary-general on March 29, 1948, referred to the Azzam Pasha quotation, citing the October 11, 1947, article in Akhbar al-Yom.

The uses to which the quotation was put 
At the time of the utterance, according to Segev, the Arab–Israeli conflict was raging also in the media of the day, as either side sought to show the other side was agitating for war. Azzam had, he concludes, 'supplied the Zionists with a sound bite that serves Israeli propaganda to this very day,' and some 395 books, and roughly 13,000 websites cite this excerpt to this day.

Azzam's quoted first sentence, without its initial caveat, appeared in English in a Jewish Agency memorandum to the United Nations Palestine Commission in February 1948. During the next few years, the same partial sentence appeared in its correct 1947 setting in several books. However, by 1952, many publications, including one published by the Israeli government, had moved its date to 1948, specifically to May 15, 1948, shortly after the outbreak of the 1948 Arab–Israeli War. As the war got underway, The Jerusalem Post quoted a further declaration from him:

Quotation source and authenticity debate 
Until 2010, the source of the quotation has been commonly claimed to be a press conference in Cairo on May 15, 1948, one day after the Israeli declaration of independence, which some versions say was broadcast by the BBC.

An Egyptian writer in 1961 maintained that the quotation was "completely out of context". He wrote that:

In 2010, doubt over the provenance of the quotation was voiced by Joffe and Romirowsky and by Morris.

In 2010, the source of the quote was traced by the computer scientist Brendan McKay to an October 11, 1947, article in the Egyptian newspaper Akhbar al-Yom, titled "A War of Extermination", which included the quote with the added words, "Personally, I hope the Jews do not force us into this war, because it would be a war of extermination and momentous massacre ". McKay shared his discovery with Jewish-American pro-Israel researcher David Barnett, who then published a paper on his discovery together with Karsh. Karsh nonetheless accused McKay of failing to share it 'with the general public' on Wikipedia, 'so as to keep Arab genocidal designs on the nascent Jewish state under wraps', which McKay called 'quite a distortion'.

Interpretation debate 
Karsh, together with his co-author, the researcher David Barnett, consider the Azzam Pasha quotation a "Genocidal threat".

Tom Segev, also an historian, disputes this interpretation, saying that "Azzam used to talk a lot" and pointing to another statement from May 21, 1948, in which Azzam Pasha declared his desire for "equal citizenship for Jews in Arab Palestine". In response to Segev, Karsh wrote that while it is true that Azzam was prepared to allow survivors of the destroyed Jewish state to live as Dhimmis, in his view "this can hardly be considered an indication of moderation".

Akhbar el-Yom interview 
In the interview to Akhbar el-Yom, Azzam predicted Palestine would be entered by large numbers of Muslim volunteers from many countries. He said that the fight would have three dimensions: faith, looting, and unstoppability, and argued that the Arabs knew how to carry on after a defeat, whereas, according to the interview, the Jews did not.

He concluded,

See also
Phrases and quotations
 A land without a people for a people without a land
 There was no such thing as Palestinians
 The bride is beautiful, but she is married to another man

References

1948 Arab–Israeli War
Political quotes
Quotations from military
1940s neologisms
Prediction